Heaven Sent is a collaboration between Boyd Rice, Douglas P. (of Death in June) and John Murphy (of The Associates), recording under the name Scorpion Wind, released in 1996 on NER. The album consists of Boyd Rice's spoken-word lyrics on subjects ranging from Social Darwinism to alcohol with backing music in various styles, including lounge and neofolk.

Track listing
"Love Love Love"
(Equilibrium) About Social Darwinism and the need for the strong to rule the weak.)
"Preserve Thy Loneliness"
(About asceticism and elitism.)
"In Vino Veritas"
(About drinking alcohol as civilization falls.)
"Paradise Of Perfection"
(About man's inability or unwillingness to confront "the downward trend of history".)
"Roasted Cadaver"
(A song from the perspective of an eternal being--Death? the sun?--sapping the life out of a dead man. A reflection on man's mortality and the eternal nature of the forces surrounding us.)
"The Cruelty Of The Heavens"
(A hymn to the deity Abraxas.)
"There Is No More Sleep"
(A fatalistic call to endure until the inevitable armageddon.)
"Some Colossus"
(A reflection on the endurance of man's greatest creations—the Colossus of Rhodes for instance as compared to the transient nature of man himself and the actions of inferior men.)
"The Path Of The Cross"
(Comparing the Iron Cross which Boyd Rice uses as a symbol for strength and war to the Christian wooden cross.)
"Never"
(Claims that a lie can never destroy truth or beauty, but instead degrades those who, by lying deserve to be degraded.)
"Message..."
(An answering machine message about a credit card bill.)

External links
 Boyd Rice Discography at Boyd Rice.com 
 Complete lyrics

1996 albums
Boyd Rice albums